"Isolation From No.13" is the third single by the Japanese horror punk band Balzac. Released through HG-FACT Records, it was sold in at least five different versions, one of them being the famous Balzac/T.W.I.M. Cereal Box Set. The band made a promotional cassette for the record.

Track listing
"Isolation From No.13"
"Black Sunday"
"Vanishes In Oblivion"

Credits
 Hirosuke - vocals
 Atsushi - guitar, vocals, chorus
 Akio - bass guitar, chorus
 Masami - drums, chorus

External links
Official Balzac Japan site
Official Balzac USA site
Official Balzac Europe site 

1996 singles
Balzac (band) songs
1996 songs